Bangaaru Kalalu is a 1974 Telugu-language drama film, produced by D. Madhusudhana Rao under Annapurna Pictures banner and directed by Adurthi Subba Rao. It stars Akkineni Nageswara Rao, Waheeda Rehman and Lakshmi, with music composed by S. Rajeswara Rao. The film was based on Yaddanapudi Sulochana Rani's novel of the same name.

Plot
Purushotham (S.V.Ranga Rao) a kind & noble person has two sons Ravi (Akkineni Nageswara Rao) & Venu (Raja Babu) and also rears a girl Saroja (Waheeda Rehman) daughter of Lakshmi who used to be governess to his children. Saroja goes into the trap of a vicious person Seshagiri (Satyanarayana) who deceives her in the name of love when everyone assumes her as dead. After five years, Ravi in search of a job meets his father's friend Raja Rao (Kanta Rao) when his only daughter Jyothi (Lakshmi) loves Ravi, and with his help Ravi start-up the industry. Once, on the occasion of Jyothi's birthday, Ravi is surprised to see Saroja as a dancer. Perturbed Ravi secretly meets her when she reveals the betrayal of Seshagiri and also regarding her baby girl, Uma (Baby Anuradha). Now Ravi takes up the responsibility for the baby and accommodates Saroja as a nurse at his close friend Dr.Prasad (Giri Babu). Parallelly, Ravi raises day by day and Purushotham & Raja Rao fixes the alliance of Ravi & Jyothi. At this junction, Chidambaram (Allu Ramalingaiah) a sly maternal uncle of Ravi joins as his manager who shacks hands with Seshagiri, both of them make-believe that Ravi has illicit relation with Saroja and also exploits Venu to sue against his brother. Here everyone accuses Ravi including Purushotham & Jyothi. Soon, they all realize his virtue after witnessing Saroja. At this point, shockingly, Seshagiri is spot dead and Ravi is indicted for the crime. Just before the judgment, Purushotham arrives & announces himself as the homicide and also affirms Saroja as his daughter. At last, Purushotham passes away. Finally, the movie ends on a happy note with the marriage of Ravi & Jyothi and the couple adopting Uma.

Cast
 Akkineni Nageswara Rao as Ravi
 Waheeda Rehman as Saroja
 Lakshmi as Jyothi
 S. V. Ranga Rao as Purushotham
 Kanta Rao as Raja Rao
 Satyanarayana as Seshagiri
 Raja Babu as Venu
 Allu Ramalingaiah as Chidambaram
 Giri Babu as Dr.Prasad
 Bhanu Prakash
 Chitti Babu as Narasimham
 Suryakantam as Jamuna Bai
 Mamatha as Radha
 Meena Kumari
 Pushpalata
 Sumathi Koushil
 Baby Anuradha as Uma

Crew
Art: G. V. Subba Rao
Choreography: Heeralal, Sundaram
Dialogues: Madhukuri Johnson, Gopi
Lyrics: Acharya Aatreya, Kosaraju, Dasaradhi 
Playback: Ghantasala, P. Susheela, V. Ramakrishna, Pithapuram, Madhavapeddi Satyam, Raghuram 
Music: S. Rajeswara Rao
Story: Yaddanapudi Sulochana Rani
Editing: M. S. Mani
Cinematography: P. S. Selvaraj
Producer: D. Madhusudhana Rao
Screenplay - Director: Adurthi Subba Rao
Banner: Annapurna Pictures
Release Date: 4 June 1974

Soundtrack

Music composed by S. Rajeswara Rao. Music released on Audio Company.

Other
 VCDs & DVDs on - VOLGA Videos, Hyderabad

References

External links

1974 films
Indian drama films
Films scored by S. Rajeswara Rao
Films based on Indian novels
1970s Telugu-language films
Films directed by Adurthi Subba Rao
Films based on novels by Yaddanapudi Sulochana Rani